Avunu may refer to:
 Avunu Valliddaru Ista Paddaru, a 2002 Telugu film written and directed by Vamsy
 Avunu (film), a 2012 Telugu film directed by Ravi Babu